Heinrich Richard Kiiver (13 January 1891 Vohnja Parish, Virumaa – 28 April 1961 Tallinn) was an Estonian politician. He was a member of III Riigikogu. On 16 May 1927, he resigned his position and he was replaced by Gustv-Eduard Lorenz.

References

1891 births
1961 deaths
Members of the Riigikogu, 1926–1929